The Immigrant in St. Louis, a survey (published 1916, written by Ruth Crawford) is a non-fiction book that tells of the average's immigrants lives in St. Louis in the early twentieth century.  It includes many graphs and tables that details the number of occupations, households in what district, births, deaths, imprisonments, etc. from each cultural group.

It was one of the first books written and published for social work. Crawford, throughout the course of the book, emphasizes the need for current citizens to help immigrants assimilate to living in the United States.  In this manner, all of the data she collected was to work to increasing social activism and help equalize the members of the St. Louis community.

In this piece of literature, Crawford touches on subjects of:
 The history of immigration to St. Louis
 The immigrants' arrival in St. Louis and the general first immersion
 Where the immigrants lived and their housing conditions
 The types of occupations kept by immigrants
 The typical education levels of immigrants in St. Louis
 The process and manner that immigrants were naturalized
 How immigrants assimilated to the city institutions
 Immigrants and relief agencies
 The work of religious and social agencies with immigrants
 The Mullanphy Fund of St. Louis, and its effects for immigrants

References

History books about the United States
History of St. Louis
Non-fiction books about immigration to the United States
Social care in the United States
1916 non-fiction books